Greenspoint Mall is a shopping mall located in the Greenspoint neighborhood of Houston, Texas, at the northeast corner of Interstate 45 and Beltway 8 (also known as the Sam Houston Parkway/Tollway). The only remaining anchor is Fitness Connection, which occupies half of the former Lord & Taylor store on the west side of the mall. There are 6 vacant anchor pads on the site that were once occupied by Macy's, Foley's, Palais Royal, Dillard's, Sears, Premiere Cinemas, Lord & Taylor, Mervyn's, and Montgomery Ward.

In 2000, the mall was among the largest five Houston-area retail developments based on net rentable area.

History
Greenspoint Mall opened in July 1976, anchored by Sears and Houston-based Foley's, the latter of which was owned at the time by Federated Department Stores who developed the mall. The mall eventually expanded by the late 1970s to include Joske's, JCPenney, Montgomery Ward and Lord & Taylor. Revolving around a "Central Park" theme, complete with a sculpture court, Greenspoint was at one point the largest mall in Greater Houston before the Galleria's later expansions in the 1980s and 2000s. Prudential Property Co. planned a $7 million renovation in 1988.

In February 1989 Greenspoint Mall was 94% occupied, making it the mall with the fourth highest percentage of occupied space in the Houston area.

Dallas-based Archon was near a deal to purchase the mall in 1998, though a Los Angeles developer would unravel the deal when it entered negotiations to purchase the mall instead. Los Angeles developer Bob Yari of Day Properties would eventually purchase the  mall from Prudential Real Estate Investments Separate Account, a pension fund investment group organized by Prudential Insurance Company of America. Yari sought to attract a mutliscreen movie theater.

The mall became a part of a redevelopment project in 1998. Office and convention center space, as well as a flea market were all being considered. As part of the redevelopment, the owners bought the closed Mervyn's and JCPenney locations in 2000.

In 2006, the management of Greenspoint Mall announced a $32 million project to refurbish the 30-year-old mall into an hybridized open-air/enclosed shopping center, entailing the demolition of the vacant anchor stores for new outdoor amenities. In November 2006, six months after the renovation was announced, Triyar Cos. LLC, owned by the Yari family, put the mall and several other Greater Houston malls for sale; the company allowed a buyer to either buy an individual property, or buy all of them at once.

After several years of nothing happening, GlennLock Sports Bar & Grill announced it would sign a lease for the first phase of the Renaissance at Greenspoint.

After the destruction of the abandoned J.C. Penney's in May 2010, a movie theater was built on the anchor pad, with a connection into the mall, through one of the former Penney's wings.

In May 2010, Sears announced that its store at Greenspoint Mall would close.

On January 4, 2017, Macy's announced that it would close their Greenspoint Mall store by the end of the second quarter of 2017.  Liquidation sales were completed and the store closed on March 27, 2017.

In 2017, when Hurricane Harvey hit Houston, and displaced flood victims exceeded the capacity for shelter at the NRG Stadium, around 800 people were relocated to the former Macy's at the mall.

Premiere Cinemas ceased operations in the mall due to the COVID-19 restrictions that were implemented in March 2020. It has never reopened for business, once restrictions were lifted, leaving the theater frozen in time, complete with the marquee and associated posters with movie titles from spring 2020.

References

External links

 

Shopping malls in Houston
Shopping malls established in 1976